Yolçatı can refer to:

 Yolçatı, Acıpayam
 Yolçatı, Adilcevaz, a village
 Yolçatı, Bolu, a village in Bolu District, Turkey
 Yolçatı, Elâzığ
 Yolçatı, Silivri, a village in Silivri District, Turkey